Friedrich Bezold (9 February 1842 – 5 October 1908) was a German otologist and professor at the University of Munich. He made several contributions to early audiology.

He is best known for developing hearing tests with tuning forks and his work to improve education for the hearing impaired. He was also the first physician to provide a clear understanding of mastoiditis.

The following medical terms are named after him:
 Bezold's abscess
 Bezold's mastoiditis: mastoiditis with perforation into the gigastric groove that creates a deep neck abscess.
 Bezold's sign: indication of descending mastoiditis
 Bezold's test: method of testing deafness by use of a tuning fork
 Bezold's triad: Three symptomatic indications of otosclerosis: 1. diminished aural perception of low frequency tones,  2. retarded bone conduction, 3. negative Rinne test
 Bezold-Edelmann continuous scale: A series of tuning forks along with Galton's whistle or monochord, in which all perceptible notes can be heard in continuous sequence. Named along with physician Adolf Edelmann (1885-1939).

References 
 Friedrich Bezold @ Who Named It

1842 births
1908 deaths
Academic staff of the Ludwig Maximilian University of Munich
German otolaryngologists